Stanislav Oleksandrovych Morozov (born 1 February 1979) is a former pair skater who competed for Ukraine and now works as a coach in Russia. With partner Tatiana Volosozhar, he was a four-time (2005, 2007, 2008, 2010) Ukrainian national champion. They placed 12th at the 2006 Winter Olympics and 8th at the 2010 Winter Olympics, and as high as 4th place at Worlds and Europeans.

Career
Morozov began skating because his father was a pair coach, however, as a young boy he was considered overweight and written off. After starting out as a singles skater, Morozov switched to pair skating at 11. He was coached by Halyna Kukhar from 1996 until 2008. Morozov first competed with Olena Bilousivska and then with Aliona Savchenko.

Savchenko and Morozov won the 2000 World Junior Championships. They went on to place 15th at the 2002 Winter Olympics. He retired from competitive skating in 2002 due to injuries, and turned to coaching. He coached the team of Tatiana Volosozhar and Petr Kharchenko, and later offered to skate with her.

Volosozhar and Morozov placed 12th at the 2006 Winter Olympics and finished 4th at the 2007 World Championships. They were originally coached by Galina Kukhar. In 2008 they moved to Chemnitz, Germany and were coached by Ingo Steuer. They won their first Grand Prix medals, a silver and a bronze, the following season, and qualified for the 2008-09 Grand Prix Final where they placed fourth. In 2009–10, they won medals at both their Grand Prix events, but did not qualify for the Grand Prix Final. They finished 8th at the 2010 Winter Olympics and did not skate at the World Championships the following month.

In March 2010, Morozov retired from competitive skating, after which he performed with Volosozhar in several shows in the spring. She teamed up with Russian skater Maxim Trankov in May 2010 and now represents Russia; Morozov is their assistant coach, working with Nina Mozer.

Programs

With Volosozhar

With Savchenko

Results

With Volosozhar

With Savchenko

With Bilousivska

References

External links

 
 

Ukrainian male pair skaters
Olympic figure skaters of Ukraine
Figure skaters at the 2002 Winter Olympics
Figure skaters at the 2006 Winter Olympics
Figure skaters at the 2010 Winter Olympics
Figure skaters at the 2007 Winter Universiade
1979 births
Living people
Sportspeople from Yekaterinburg
Medalists at the 2007 Winter Universiade
World Junior Figure Skating Championships medalists
Russian figure skating coaches
Universiade medalists in figure skating
Universiade silver medalists for Russia
Competitors at the 2001 Goodwill Games